Karl Darlow (born 8 October 1990) is an English professional footballer who plays as a goalkeeper for Championship club Hull City on loan from Premier League club Newcastle United. He is the grandson of former Wales international forward Ken Leek who was included in the Welsh 1958 World Cup squad. Darlow is a product of the Aston Villa and Nottingham Forest academies and spent time on loan at both Newport County and Walsall earlier in his career.

Club career

Nottingham Forest
Weeks after being released by  Aston Villa at the age of 16, Villa goalkeeping coach Eric Steele recommended Darlow to Forest and he was signed up in their academy. After impressive displays in the reserve team Darlow was awarded a space on the bench where he was present for the majority of the 2010–11 season. His debut was against Crystal Palace, on the last day of the 2010–11 season, as a substitute for Lee Camp. The Reds won the game 3–0, a result that secured them a play-off spot.

In March 2012, Darlow joined Newport County in the Conference National league on loan for a month. He made his first appearance for the club in a 1–0 home win against Gateshead.

On 21 September 2012, Darlow joined Walsall on loan for one month. While there, he signed a new three-year contract at parent club Forest, keeping him there until 2015. On 22 October, his loan with Walsall was extended until 22 December 2012, however Forest recalled him four days later due for an injured Forest goalkeeper Dimitar Evtimov.

He rejoined Walsall on 1 January 2013 in a one-month loan deal, with the view to extending the loan for the end of the season,

Darlow was recalled again on 10 January after first choice Lee Camp had been told he could leave the club on a free transfer. On 12 January 2013 he made his full Forest league debut in the 2–1 win over Peterborough, and ended with 20 league appearances for the club in the 2012–13 season. Darlow signed a new four-year contract on 23 August 2013 and established himself as manager Billy Davies's first-choice goalkeeper despite the summer arrival of Dorus de Vries.

Newcastle United
On 9 August 2014, Darlow signed a long-term contract with Premier League club Newcastle United for an undisclosed fee. As part of the deal, he and teammate Jamaal Lascelles were loaned back to Nottingham Forest for the 2014–15 season.

He made his debut for Newcastle on 25 August 2015, in a League Cup fixture against Northampton Town which Newcastle won 4–1. He made his Premier League debut on 28 December 2015, against West Bromwich Albion as a late inclusion, after regular keeper Rob Elliot was forced to pull out due to illness; the Magpies lost the game 1–0 after Darlow let Darren Fletcher's header slip through his hands. Following a season-ending injury to Elliot while away on international duty, Darlow was forced to take over in net for Newcastle's final 8 matches as they attempted to avoid relegation. On 30 April 2016, Darlow saved a penalty from Yohan Cabaye, in a 1–0 Premier League win against Crystal Palace. Newcastle were relegated on 11 May following a victory for rivals Sunderland over Everton.

Darlow entered the 2016–17 season in a competition with summer signing Matz Sels to start the Championship season in goal, which Darlow lost. Darlow played in Newcastle's first two League Cup matches against Cheltenham Town and Wolverhampton, picking up clean sheets in both. On 28 September, Darlow received his first Championship start of the season, replacing Sels against Norwich City for a 4–3 win. He became the club's first-choice goalkeeper under Rafael Benítez ahead of Elliot, Sels and Freddie Woodman. Darlow  made 34 appearances, keeping 13 clean sheets, in 2016–17 as Newcastle were promoted to the Premier League as winners of the Championship. Darlow would compete with Rob Elliot during 2017–18 season as first choice Goalkeeper in the Premier League, with Darlow making 12 appearances, however both lost their place in the team when Martin Dúbravka was signed on loan in January 2018.

After starting the 2018–19 season as second choice behind Dúbravka, Darlow made his first and only appearance of the season on 29 August 2018, when he started in the EFL Cup 3–1 defeat against his former club Nottingham Forest. On 11 September 2020, he signed a five-year extension to his contract that would keep him at the club until 2025.

Hull City (loan)
On 31 January 2023, Darlow joined Hull City on loan for the remainder of the 2022–23 season. The terms on his loan meant that Darlow could not be recalled despite Newcastle facing a goalkeeping shortage ahead of the 2023 EFL Cup final on 26 February. He made his debut for Hull City on 25 February 2023, in a 1–0 loss away to Bristol City.

International career
In addition to England, Darlow is eligible to represent Wales as his grandfather Ken Leek (a Wales international forward) was born in Ynysybwl. The Football Association of Wales confirmed Darlow had declined an invitation to be included in the Wales national football team friendly match against Austria on 6 February 2013.

New Wales Manager Ryan Giggs approached Darlow in March 2018 to be included in the Wales squad. Darlow advised he was currently concentrating on winning back his place in the Newcastle United starting line-up.

Speculation developed that Darlow might have ended his playing in the Wales squad in November 2020 after revealing his ambition of playing for England, saying: "It’s the one thing that as a child you want to do" and "I would love nothing more".

Career statistics

Honours
Newcastle United
EFL Championship: 2016–17

References

External links

Nottingham Forest profile

1990 births
Living people
Footballers from Northampton
English footballers
Association football goalkeepers
Nottingham Forest F.C. players
Newport County A.F.C. players
Walsall F.C. players
Newcastle United F.C. players
Hull City A.F.C. players
English Football League players
National League (English football) players
English people of Welsh descent
Premier League players